Articles (arranged alphabetically) related to Ethiopia include:



0-9 
 1983–1985 famine in Ethiopia
 2007–2008 Ethiopian crackdown in Ogaden
 2015 Ethiopian general election
 2021 Ethiopian general election
 1960 in Ethiopia
 1974 in Ethiopia
 2001 in Ethiopia
 2003 in Ethiopia
 2005 in Ethiopia
 2006 in Ethiopia
 2007 in Ethiopia
 2009 in Ethiopia
 2012 in Ethiopia
 2013 in Ethiopia
 2014 in Ethiopia
 2015 in Ethiopia
 2016 in Ethiopia
 2017 in Ethiopia
 2018 in Ethiopia
 2019 in Ethiopia
 2020 in Ethiopia
 2021 in Ethiopia

A 
 Adama (Nazreth)
 Addis Ababa
 Addis Neger (newspaper)
 Addis Neger (website)
 Addis Ababa University
 Aethiopia
 Afar language
 Agriculture in Ethiopia
 Aman Andom
 Amharic language
 Anuak language
 Anuak people
 Anuak Militants
 Arba Minch
 Arba Minch Airport US drone base
 Army of the Ethiopian Empire
 Assab
 Awasa Hawassa
 Amhara region

B 
 Bahir Dar
 Banco di Napoli see Commercial Bank of Ethiopia
 Banco di Roma    as above
 Battle of Adowa 1896
 Benito Mussolini
 Beta Israel (Falasha, Jews of Ethiopia)
 Berhane Asfaw
 Birtukan Mideksa
 Blue Nile (Abay River)

C 
 Central Statistical Agency (Ethiopia)
 Mahay Choramo
 Christianity in Ethiopia
 Coffee
 Commercial Bank of Ethiopia
 Communications in Ethiopia
 Copt
 Coptic Christian
 Cuisine of Ethiopia
 Culture of Ethiopia
 Cush
 Cushitic language

D 
 Danakil
 Derg
 Dawit Kebede
 Djibouti
 Do They Know It's Christmas?

E 
 Economy of Ethiopia
 Education in Ethiopia
 Egypt–Ethiopia relations
 Elections in Ethiopia
 Emperor of Ethiopia
 Environmental issues in Ethiopia
 Eritrea
 Eritrean Liberation Front ELF
 Eritrean People's Liberation Front EPLF
 Eritrean-Ethiopian War
 Ethiopia
 Ethiopia national football team
 Ethiopia at the Olympics
 Ethiopia-United States Mapping Mission
 Ethiopia-United States relations
 Ethiopian Airlines
 Ethiopian aristocratic and court titles
 Ethiopian Armenians
 Ethiopian Biotechnology Institute
 Ethiopian Civil War
 Ethiopian deforestation
 Ethiopian Empire
 Ethiopian Highway 15
 Ethiopian historiography
 Ethiopian Horticulture Development Agency
 Ethiopian Horticulture Producer Exporters Association
 Ethiopian Journalists Forum
 Ethiopian Mapping Authority
 Ethiopian Studies
 Ethiopic
 Ethiopia Scout Association
 Ethiopian birr
 Ethiopian calendar
 Ethiopian highlands
 Ethiopian Orthodox Tewahido Church
 Ethiopian Patriotic Association
 Ethiopian Women Exporters' Association
 Ethiopis

F 
 Famines in Ethiopia
 Fetha Nagast
 First Italo-Ethiopian War
 Fishing in Ethiopia
 Food security in Ethiopia
 Forestry in Ethiopia

G 
 Ge'ez language
 Geography of Ethiopia
 Government of Ethiopia
 Greeks in Ethiopia

H 
 Harar
 Haile Selassie
 Hailemariam Desalegn
 Health in Ethiopia
 Hinduism in Ethiopia
 History of Ethiopia
 Horn of Africa
 Human rights in Ethiopia

I 
 Imperial Railway Company of Ethiopia
 Isaias Afwerki
 Islam in Ethiopia
 Italian East Africa
 Italian Empire
 Italians of Ethiopia
 Italian guerrilla war in Ethiopia
 Iyasu V

J 
 Jimma

K 
 Kebra Nagast
 Kenya
 Khat Catha edulis
 Kingdom of Italy (1861–1946)
 Konso

L 
 Lake Tana
 LGBT rights in Ethiopia (Gay rights)
 List of Abunas of Ethiopia
 List of airports in Ethiopia
 List of Ambassadors from Ethiopia
 List of birds of Ethiopia
 List of cities and towns in Ethiopia
 List of companies of Ethiopia
 List of diplomatic missions in Ethiopia
 List of emperors of Ethiopia
 List of Ethiopians
 List of heads of government of Ethiopia
 List of hospitals in Ethiopia
 List of lakes in Ethiopia
 List of legendary monarchs of Ethiopia
 List of mammals in Ethiopia
 List of mountains in Ethiopia
 List of national parks of Ethiopia
 List of political parties in Ethiopia
 List of presidents of Ethiopia
 List of rivers of Ethiopia
 List of universities and colleges in Ethiopia
 List of volcanoes in Ethiopia

M 
 Manufacturing in Ethiopia
 Marcus Garvey
 Maria Theresa thaler
 Marxism
 Media in Ethiopia
 Menelik II
 Meles Zenawi
 Merid Wolde Aregay
 Alfonso Mendes 
 Mengistu Haile Mariam
 Military of Ethiopia
 Michael Tsegaye
 Monarchies of Ethiopia

N 
 National and Grindlays Bank
 National Bank of Ethiopia
 Negasso Gidada
 Nile River

O 
 Ogaden
 OAU
 Omo River
 Oromia Region
 Oromo language
 Oromo people

P 
 

 Pentay
 People's Democratic Republic of Ethiopia
 Politics of Ethiopia
 President of Ethiopia
 Prester John
 Project Harar
 Protestantism in Ethiopia

Q 
 Qallu

R 
 Railway stations in Ethiopia
 Rastafari movement
 Red Terror (Ethiopia)
 Regions of Ethiopia
 Richard Pankhurst
 Roman Catholicism in Ethiopia
 Royal Bank of Scotland - see Commercial Bank of Ethiopia

S 
 Schools in Ethiopia
 Second Italo-Abyssinian War
 Somalia
 SOS Sahel Ethiopia
 State Bank of Ethiopia  new name, see National Bank of Ethiopia
 Sudan

T 
 Tabot
 Taddesse Tamrat
 Teff
 Tewodros II
 Tigre language
 Tigray Province
 Tigray Region
 Tigray-Tigrinya people
 Tigray War
 Tigrinya language
 Time in Ethiopia
 Timeline of the Tigray War
 Tourism in Ethiopia
 Transport in Ethiopia

U 
 United Nations Mission in Ethiopia and Eritrea
 United States Ambassador to Ethiopia

V 
 Victor Emmanuel III

W 
 Wag
 Water supply and sanitation in Ethiopia
 Wollo
 Women in Ethiopia
 Woreda

X 
 X-Rays

Y 
 Yeha
 Yekatit 12
 Yemen
 Yohannes Haile-Selassie
 Yohannes IV
 Yolyos

Z 
 Zagwe dynasty
 Zeresenay Alemseged
 Zewditu I
 Lake Zway

See also
 Lists of country-related topics - similar lists for other countries

 
Ethiopia